Carvalho or de Carvalho, meaning 'oak', is a Portuguese surname.

The surname is most common in Portugal, Brazil, Galicia (although in Galicia it may be spelled 'Carbajal', 'Carvallo' or 'Carballo'), the former Portuguese African colonies (Angola, Mozambique, etc.) and people from the State of Goa in India as well as from Vasai, a town to the north of Mumbai in India.

People
Alan Carvalho, Brazilian footballer
Alexandre Herculano de Carvalho e Araújo, Portuguese historian, 19th century
Amauri Carvalho de Oliveira, Brazilian football player
Ana Maria Carvalho, Brazilian-American professor of Spanish and Portuguese at the University of Arizona
Antonio Carvalho, Canadian mixed martial artist
António Carvalho (cyclist), Portuguese cyclist
Auliʻi Cravalho, American actress and singer
Beth Carvalho, Brazilian singer
Brennen Carvalho, American football player
Bruno Carvalho (disambiguation), several people
Charlene de Carvalho-Heineken, American-born heiress
Daniel da Silva Carvalho, Brazilian football player
Daniel da Cruz Carvalho, Portuguese football player
Edgar Patricio de Carvalho Pacheco, Angolan football player
Edílson Pereira de Carvalho, Brazilian football referee
Eleazar de Carvalho, Brazilian music conductor
Emanuel Nunes Carvalho, American rabbi, 18th century
Evandro Carvalho, American politician
Evaristo Carvalho (1941–2022), São Tomé and Príncipe prime minister
Felipe Carvalho, Uruguayan football player
Flávio de Carvalho jr., Brazilian chess master
Gracie Carvalho, Brazilian model
Gui Carvalho, Brazilian basketball player
Januario Antonio de Carvalho, Hong Kong official, 19th century
Jaqueline Carvalho, Brazilian volleyball player
João de Sousa Carvalho, Portuguese composer, 18th century 
Joaquim Carvalho, Portuguese soccer player
José Cândido Carvalho, Brazilian writer
Karina Carvalho, Australian TV news anchor
Laura de Carvalho Rizzotto aka Laura Rizzotto , Latvian-Brazilian musician
Léon Carvalho, French impresario and stage director 
Luiz Carvalho, Brazilian breaststroke swimmer 
Luís Cláudio Carvalho da Silva, Brazilian footballer
Luiz Fernando Carvalho, Brazilian director
Maria das Graças Carvalho Dantas, Brazilian-Spanish politician
Manuel Carvalho da Silva, coordinator of the General Confederation of the Portuguese Workers
Marie Caroline Miolan-Carvalho, French operatic soprano
Michel de Carvalho, husband of Charlene de Carvalho-Heineken
Mordecai Baruch Carvalho, Tunisian rabbi
Otelo Saraiva de Carvalho, Portuguese military officer
Pedro Carvalho Cabral, Portuguese rugby union player
Pedro Carvalho (actor), Portuguese actor
Peter Carvalho, Indian football player
Ricardo Carvalho, Portuguese football player
Ricardo Carvalho Calero, Galician professor
Roger Carvalho, Brazilian footballer
Ronald de Carvalho, Brazilian poet and diplomat
Scheila Carvalho, Brazilian dancer and model
Sebastião de Melo, Marquis of Pombal, Portuguese statesman
Solomon Nunes Carvalho, American painter and photographer
Taynara Melo de Carvalho as Taynara Conti, Brazilian professional wrestler
William Carvalho, Portuguese professional footballer

Other
Mr Joe B. Carvalho, Indian film
Pepe Carvalho, fictional private detective in the novels of Manuel Vázquez Montalbán.

See also
 Carvalhoi (disambiguation)
 Carballo (disambiguation)

References

Surnames
Portuguese-language surnames